Dehkaran (also Romanized as Dehkarān and Deh Karān; also known as Dehgarān) is a village in Dowlatabad Rural District, in the Central District of Jiroft County, Kerman Province, Iran. At the 2006 census, its population was 23, in 5 families.

References 

Populated places in Jiroft County